Ernst Edvard Krogius (June 6, 1865 – September 21, 1955) was a Finnish lawyer, shipowner and sailor who competed in the 1912 Summer Olympics. He was a crew member of the Finnish boat Heatherbell, which won the bronze medal in the 12 metre class.

References

External links
profile

1865 births
1955 deaths
Finnish male sailors (sport)
Sailors at the 1912 Summer Olympics – 12 Metre
Olympic sailors of Finland
Olympic bronze medalists for Finland
International Olympic Committee members
Olympic medalists in sailing
Medalists at the 1912 Summer Olympics
19th-century Finnish lawyers
Finnish businesspeople in shipping